St. James City is an unincorporated community and census-designated place (CDP) on Pine Island in Lee County, Florida, United States. The population was 3,876 at the 2020 census, up from 3,784 at the 2010 census. It is part of the Cape Coral-Fort Myers, Florida Metropolitan Statistical Area.

Geography
The St. James City CDP occupies the southern half of Pine Island, with the town center situated at the southern end of the island. The community is bordered by San Carlos Bay to the south, by Pine Island Sound to the west, by San Carlos Bay, Matlacha Pass, and Pine Island Creek to the east, and by the community of Pine Island Center to the north. Stringfellow Road (County Road 767) is the main road in the community, running north–south along the center of the island.

Demographics

As of the census of 2000, there were 4,105 people, 2,138 households, and 1,417 families residing in the CDP. The racial makeup of the CDP was 98.95% White, 0.10% African American, 0.15% Native American, 0.27% Asian, 0.15% from other races, and 0.39% from two or more races. Hispanic or Latino of any race were 0.76% of the population.

There were 2,138 households, out of which 7.0% had children under the age of 18 living with them, 62.4% were married couples living together, 2.5% had a female householder with no husband present, and 33.7% were non-families. 28.1% of all households were made up of individuals, and 18.2% had someone living alone who was 65 years of age or older.  The average household size was 1.92 and the average family size was 2.28.

In the CDP, the population was spread out, with 7.1% under the age of 18, 1.7% from 18 to 24, 10.8% from 25 to 44, 35.4% from 45 to 64, and 45.0% who were 65 years of age or older.  The median age was 63 years. For every 100 females, there were 98.5 males.  For every 100 females age 18 and over, there were 97.8 males.

The median income for a household in the CDP was $35,746, and the median income for a family was $42,176. Males had a median income of $34,120 versus $22,179 for females. The per capita income for the CDP was $26,520.  About 1.5% of families and 4.3% of the population were below the poverty line, including 6.0% of those under age 18 and 3.8% of those age 65 or over.

References

Census-designated places in Lee County, Florida
Census-designated places in Florida
Populated places on the Intracoastal Waterway in Florida
Pine Island (Lee County, Florida)